Pa Qaleh or Paqaleh may refer to:
 Pa Qaleh, Fars
 Pa Qaleh, Golestan
 Pa Qaleh, Ilam
 Pa Qaleh, Sarduiyeh, Jiroft County, Kerman Province
 Pa Qaleh, Shahr-e Babak, Kerman Province
 Pa Qaleh, Kermanshah
 Pa Qaleh-ye Khoskheh Rud, Kermanshah Province
 Pa Qaleh, Lorestan
 Pa Qaleh, North Khorasan
 Pa Qaleh, Razavi Khorasan
 Pa Qaleh, Semnan
 Pa Qaleh, West Azerbaijan
 Pa Qaleh Rural District, in Kerman Province